Piesocorynini is a tribe of fungus weevils in the family Anthribidae. There are at least 2 genera and about 8 described species in Piesocorynini.

Genera
 Brachycorynus Valentine, 1998
 Piesocorynus Dejean, 1834

References

 Valentine, Barry D. (1998). "A review of Nearctic and some related Anthribidae (Coleoptera)". Insecta Mundi, vol. 12, no. 3 and 4, 251–296.

Further reading

 Arnett, R.H. Jr., M. C. Thomas, P. E. Skelley and J. H. Frank. (eds.). (2002). American Beetles, Volume II: Polyphaga: Scarabaeoidea through Curculionoidea. CRC Press LLC, Boca Raton, FL.
 
 Richard E. White. (1983). Peterson Field Guides: Beetles. Houghton Mifflin Company.

Anthribidae